Blackadder is a British television show starring Rowan Atkinson.

Blackadder or Blackader may also refer to:
Blackadder, Scottish Borders, a Scottish village 
Blackadder (clipper), a clipper ship built in 1870
Blackadder Water, a river in the Scottish Borders
Clan Blackadder, a Scottish clan
Blackadder baronets, a Scottish baronetcy
Blackadder ITC, an OpenType font
Blackadder (whisky bottler), an independent bottler of Scotch whisky
Blackadder House, an estate near Allanton, Scotland

People
 Agnes Forbes Blackadder (1875–1964), Scottish medic 
 Charles Blackader (1869–1921), British general in the First World War
 Elizabeth Blackadder (1931–2021), Scottish painter
 John Blackadder (preacher) (ca. 1622–1685) Scottish Presbyterian Covenanter preacher
 John Blackadder (soldier) (1664–1729), Scottish soldier
 Robert Blackadder (d. 1508), medieval Scottish cleric, diplomat and politician
 Todd Blackadder (born 1971), New Zealand rugby player

Fictional characters
Edmund Blackadder, various related characters on Blackadder
Vivian Blackadder, on JAG

See also
Blackadder Water, a river in Scotland
Black adder (disambiguation), snakes